James Orr MacAndrew (22 June 1899 – 1979) was Unionist MP for South Ayrshire for 1931–35. This was normally a safe Labour seat which MacAndrew did well to win in the National Government landslide in the 1931 general election, but he lost it in the limited Labour revival in 1935.

MacAndrew was born on 22 June 1899, the son of F G MacAndrew of Knock Castle, Largs.   He married Eileen Butterfield in 1944: the marriage produced one recorded daughter.

His education included time at Glenalmond College and at Trinity Hall, Cambridge.   He joined the British Royal Flying Corps (RFC) in 1917 and was severely wounded in France in 1918 (by which time the RFC had morphed into the RAF).

He was an army officer, reaching the rank of lieutenant-colonel.   During the Second World War He was Honorary Colonel of the Ayrshire Yeomanry.

In addition to his political and military achievements he was Joint-Master of the Eglinton Foxhounds 1939–40.

Sources

External links 
 

1890s births
1979 deaths
Members of the Parliament of the United Kingdom for Scottish constituencies
UK MPs 1931–1935
Unionist Party (Scotland) MPs
Alumni of Trinity Hall, Cambridge
People educated at Glenalmond College